Noeline Elizabeth Alcorn  is a New Zealand education-research academic, and as of 2019 is a full professor at the University of Waikato.

Academic career
After attending Samuel Marsden Collegiate School in Wellington, New Zealand and a 1971 PhD titled Vision and nightmare : a study of Doris Lessing's novels at the University of California, Irvine, Alcorn moved to the University of Waikato, rising to full professor.

Honours and awards
In 1993, Alcorn was awarded the New Zealand Suffrage Centennial Medal. In the 2005 Queen's Birthday Honours, she was appointed a Companion of the Queen's Service Order for public services.

Selected works 
 Alcorn, Noeline. To the fullest extent of his powers: CE Beeby's life in education. Victoria University Press, 1999.
 Locke, Terry, Noeline Alcorn, and John O’Neill. "Ethical issues in collaborative action research." Educational Action Research 21, no. 1 (2013): 107–123.
 Alcorn, Noeline. "Teacher education in New zealand 1974–2014." Journal of Education for Teaching 40, no. 5 (2014): 447–460.
 Alcorn, Noeline. "Knowledge through a collaborative network: a cross‐cultural partnership." Educational action research 18, no. 4 (2010): 453–466.
 Alcorn, Noeline, and Martin Thrupp. "Uncovering meanings: The discourses of New Zealand secondary teachers in context." New Zealand Journal of Educational Studies 47, no. 1 (2012): 107.

References

External links
 

Living people
New Zealand women academics
Year of birth missing (living people)
University of California, Irvine alumni
Academic staff of the University of Waikato
New Zealand educational theorists
Companions of the Queen's Service Order
Recipients of the New Zealand Suffrage Centennial Medal 1993
People educated at Samuel Marsden Collegiate School
New Zealand women writers